Nicholas Amponsah (born 9 July 1997) is a Ghanaian footballer who plays as a defender.

Career
Amponsah played for Jamaican club Montego Bay United before signing for the Chattanooga Red Wolves.

References

External links 
 

1997 births
Living people
Montego Bay United F.C. players
Chattanooga Red Wolves SC players
USL League One players
Ghanaian footballers
Ghanaian expatriate footballers
Association football defenders
Ghanaian expatriate sportspeople in the United States
Expatriate soccer players in the United States
People from Ashanti Region